The 2018–19 Syracuse Orange men's basketball team represented Syracuse University during the 2018–19 NCAA Division I men's basketball season. The Orange, led by 43rd-year head coach Jim Boeheim, played their home games at the Carrier Dome in Syracuse, New York as sixth-year members of the Atlantic Coast Conference. Syracuse received a bid to the 2019 NCAA men's basketball tournament as the number eight seed in the West region, where they lost in the round of 64 to ninth seeded Baylor.

Previous season
The Orange finished the 2017–18 season 23–14, 8–10 in ACC play to finish in a tie for tenth place. They defeated Wake Forest in the first round of the 2018 ACC tournament before losing in the second round to North Carolina. They received one of the final four at-large bids to the NCAA tournament where, as a No. 11 seed, they defeated Arizona State in the First Four, and upset No. 6 seed TCU in the First Round and No. 3 seed Michigan State in the Second Round before losing in the Sweet Sixteen to fellow ACC member and No. 2 seed Duke.

Offseason

Departures

2018 recruiting class

Future recruits

2019 recruiting class

Roster

Depth chart

Source:

Schedule and results

Source:

|-
!colspan=12 style=| Exhibition

|-
!colspan=12 style=| Non-conference regular season

|-
!colspan=12 style=| ACC regular season

|-
!colspan=12 style=| ACC Tournament

|-
!colspan=12 style=| NCAA tournament

 Record for the largest on-campus attendance in college basketball history.

Rankings

*AP does not release post-NCAA Tournament rankings^Coaches did not release a Week 2 poll.

References

Syracuse Orange men's basketball seasons
Syracuse
Syracuse basketball, men
Syracuse basketball, men
Syracuse